Egon Joseph Wellesz CBE (21 October 1885 – 9 November 1974) was an Austrian, later British composer, teacher and musicologist, notable particularly in the field of Byzantine music.

Early life and education in Vienna 
Egon Joseph Wellesz was born on 21 October 1885 in the Schottengasse district of Vienna to Samú Wellesz and Ilona Wellesz (née Lovenyi). Although his parent met and married in Vienna, they both originated from Hungary and came from Jewish families in that nation. His parents, while ethnically Hungarian Jews, were both practicing Christians in Vienna and Wellesz received a Protestant upbringing. He later converted to Catholicism. As a boy he attended the Franz Josephs Gymnasium on Hegel Street where he received a classical education in Greek and Latin.

Wellesz's father worked in the textile business and his parents initially intended Wellesz to join him in his work, or pursue a career as a civil servant. In order to achieve that aim, his parents were intent upon Wellesz pursuing an education in the law.  Accordingly, Wellesz entered the University of Vienna as a law student following the completion of his studies at the Franz Josephs Gymnasium. However, Wellesz's own career ambitions had been bent towards music for several years prior to his entrance to the University of Vienna. This desire to pursue a music career had been formed after attending a performance of Carl Maria von Webers Der Freischütz under the baton of Gustav Mahler at the Vienna State Opera on October 21, 1898; a present from his parents on his 13th birthday. This opera so moved Wellesz that he decided he wanted to become a composer. Prior to this experience, Wellesz had already had some excellent music education as a boy, as his mother was a music enthusiast and amateur pianist who encourage music studies as a hobby. He began his initial music training at a young age studying the piano with his mother's teacher, Carl Frühling.

In 1905, at the age of 19, Wellesz began studying harmony and counterpoint at Eugenie Schwarzwald's school with Arnold Schoenberg while simultaneously attending law classes at the university. Schwarzwald's school became an important part of not only his musical development but also his social life. There he became the conductor of a school choir and he met and befriended the poet Rainer Maria Rilke, the architect Adolf Loos, and the painter Oskar Kokoschka; the latter of whom painted his portrait in 1911. He also met his future wife, Emmy Stross, who was a student at that school. Wellesz's lessons with Schoenberg took place at Schoenberg 's Liechtensteinstrasse apartment where he received a thorough and rigorous training in the fundamentals of music. These lessons, however, lasted only  a matter of months, and ended when he began studies in musicology with Guido Adler at the University of Vienna later in 1905.  Adler had founded the Musicological Institute at the University of Vienna and was a leading editor of the Austrian Denkmäler der Tonkunst in Österreich. He and Schoenberg's dual influences shaped much of Wellesz's musical and scholarly thought. His 1921 book on Schoenberg is still a standard source on Schoenberg's early period.

Work as a scholar, lecturer, and composer in Vienna
The main focus of Wellesz's early musicological research was Baroque opera; particularly those by composer Giuseppe Bonno who was the subject of his dissertation at the University of Vienna. He also edited Johann Joseph Fux's 1723 opera Costanza e fortezza for publication in Adler's Denkmäler. Many years later Wellesz published a monograph on Fux in 1965. He graduated from the University of Vienna with a degree in musicology in 1908, and his dissertation on Bonno was published the following year. He married Emmy Stross in 1908, and had a very long and happy marriage.

In 1913 Wellesz joined the faculty of the University of Vienna as a lecturer in music history. That same he embarked upon what would become a lifelong interest in the musical achievements of Byzantium.<ref>Miloš Velimirović. ''Egon Wellesz and the Study of Byzantine Chant], in Music Quarterly, April 1976, p 265-277</ref> This interest initially arose from dialogues and debates with the Austrian art historian Josef Strzygowski who at this time was putting forward a new theory that many of the elements of Early Christian architecture, such as the rounded dome, originated not in the West but in the East; ideas published in his Orient oder Rom. Wellesz had plenty of opportunity to discuss these theories directly with Strzygowski as his wife Emmy was an art historian who specialized in the art of India and was a disciple and close friend of Strzygowski. These discussions awoke an interest in him to study the early roots of Christianity and compare the development of chant in the East and the West.

1913 was also the first year one of Wellesz's compositions was publicly performed. The five movement String Quartet No 1, op 14 received its premiere on 31 October, showing the clear influence of Mahler and Schoenberg. Wellesz was the first pupil of Schoenberg to gain independent success as a composer, receiving a contract from Universal Edition before Berg or Webern. Three further string quartets followed during the war years, establishing his preference for linear chromaticism, and some of them explicitly categorised as atonal. However, it was with dramatic music that Wellesz really made his mark, starting with the ballet Das Wunder der Diana in 1914. In the following 12 years he completed five operas and three ballets, many of the libretti and ballet scenarios written by the important literary figures Hugo von Hofmannsthal and Jakob Wassermann. Operas such as Alkestis (1924) and Die Bakchantinnen (1931) take their subject matter from ancient mythology and, in contrast to the Wagnerian tradition, use techniques such as dance pantomime and coloratura singing derived from Claudio Monteverdi and Christoph Willibald Gluck.

In 1922 Wellesz, along with Rudolph Reti and others, founded the Internationale Gesellschaft für Neue Musik (IGNM) following the
Internationale Kammermusikaufführungen Salzburg, a festival of modern chamber music held as part of the Salzburg Festival. 
This soon evolved into the International Society for Contemporary Music, founded in 1923 with its headquarters in London. The Cambridge academic Edward J. Dent, whom Wellesz had met on his first trip to London in 1906, was elected as its president.Haas, Michael. 'Egon Wellesz: The Forgotten Modernist', in Forbidden Music, 4 June 2014

In 1929 Wellesz was promoted from lecturer to professor at the University of Vienna; succeeding Adler in his position at the university. He remained in that post until the events of the Anschluss on 13 March 1938 made it no longer safe for him to reside in Austria.

 Life in England 
His links to England turned out to be fortunate in 1938 when Wellesz was forced to leave Austria in the wake of the Anschluss. By good fortune he was in Amsterdam on 12 March 1938 to hear his orchestral suite Prosperos Beschwörungen ("Prospero's Invocation", after The Tempest) conducted by Bruno Walter. Once in England he worked for a time on Grove's Dictionary of Music, but in July 1940 he was interned as an enemy alien, ultimately in Hutchinson Camp in the Isle of Man. He gained his release later that year, on 13 October, thanks to intercessions by Ralph Vaughan Williams and H. C. Colles, the long-standing chief music critic of The Times.  Following his internment in 1940 Wellesz found himself unable to compose, a creative block eventually broken by the composition of the String Quartet No 5 (1943–44), the first important work of his English period.  His response to the great English poet Gerard Manley Hopkins also helped re-kindle his urge to compose, resulting in his setting of The Leaden and the Golden Echo in 1944.

Despite his composing, Wellesz remains best known as an academic and teacher, and for his extensive scholarly contributions to the study of Byzantine music and opera in the 17th century. These contributions brought for him an honorary doctorate from Oxford University in 1932 and later a Fellowship at Lincoln College, Oxford, where he remained until his death. His pupils there included Herbert Chappell, Martin Cooper, Kunihiko Hashimoto, Spike Hughes, Frederick May, Wilfrid Mellers, Nigel Osborne and Peter Sculthorpe.

A portrait was made of Wellesz by Jean Cooke, who had been commissioned for the work by Lincoln College. (There is also an early portrait, painted in 1911 by Oskar Kokoschka). Wellesz continued composing until he suffered a stroke in 1972. He died two years later and was buried in the Zentralfriedhof in Vienna. His widow Emmy Stross, whom he married in 1908, returned to live in Vienna until her own death in 1987.

 Music 
Wellesz composed at least 112 works with opus numbers as well as some 20 without numbers. His large scale dramatic works (including six operas) were mostly completed during his Vienna period (the main exception being the comic opera Incognita, written with the Oxford poet Elizabeth Mackenzie and first staged there in 1952). Robert Layton regarded Alkestis as "probably his most remarkable achievement for the stage. Its invention is marvellously sustained and organically conceived". It was successfully revived in the 1950s and 1960s.

Altogether he wrote nine symphonies and an equal number of string quartets, the former starting in 1945 and the latter series of works spread throughout his life. Several of his symphonies have titles, including the second (the English), fourth (the Austriaca) and seventh (Contra torrentum). They were generally well received in Austria, Germany and England, but even so the Third Symphony (1950–1) was only published posthumously and only received its world premiere in Vienna in 2000. Other compositions included the Octet (using Schubert's combination); piano and violin concertos (one of each); choral works such as the Mass in F minor; and a number of vocal works with orchestral or chamber accompaniment.

Stylistically his earliest music, somewhat like that of Ernst Krenek, is in a dissonant but recognisably tonal style; there is a definite second period of sorts around the time of the first two symphonies (1940s) in which his music has a somewhat Brucknerian sound – in the symphonies sometimes an equal breadth, though still with something of a 20th-century feel and harmonies – but after the Fourth Symphony his music became more tonally vague in character, with serial techniques used, though still with hints of tonality, as in the Eighth Quartet.

Rather than follow his teacher Schoenberg's Expressionist style, Wellesz found inspiration in music from the pre-modern era (with the exception of Mahler), becoming a forerunner to the anti-Romantic currents of the twenties. As well as the dramatic works, the chamber and orchestral pieces with voice often use these "baroque" elements. An example is the cantata Amor Timido (1933), a favourite of Wilfrid Mellers. Elsewhere, the neo-classical spirit of Hindemith is evident, as in the Piano Concerto (1931) and (still there much later) in the Divertimento (1969).

He wrote:In place of the infinite melody, the finite must return, in the place of dissolved, amorphous structures, clear, clearly outlined forms. The opera of the future must tie in with the traditions of Baroque opera. This is the natural form, the innermost essence of opera.

Recordings
A complete recording set of his nine symphonies by Radio Symphonieorchester Wien conducted by Gottfried Rabl is available, and there are recordings of three of the quartets, choral works including the Mass, the violin and piano concertos, and other orchestral works including Prosperos Beschwörungen, Vorfrühling and the Symphonic Epilogue.Capriccio 67 077 (2004), reviewed at MusicWeb International
 Chamber Music:  includes the Clarinet Quintet, Op. 81, String Trio, Op. 86, Four Pieces for String Quartet, Op. 103, and Four Pieces for String Trio, Op. 105.  Veles Ensemble, Toccata TOCC0617 (2023)
 Piano Concerto: with Triptychon, Op 98; Divertimento, Op. 107; Drei Skizzen, Op. 6; Eklogen, Op. 11. Karl-Andreas Kolly (piano), Luzerner Sinfonieorchester/ Howard Griffiths, Pan Classics 510104 (1999)
 String Quartets: No. 3, 4 and 6. Artis Quartett Wien. NIMBUS NI 5821 (2008)
 Symphonies No 1 - 9 (4-CD Set). Radio Symphonieorchester Wien/Gottfried Rabl, CPO 777183-2 (2009)
 '20th Century Portraits': The Dawn of Spring; Sonnets from the Portuguese Op. 52; Song of the World, Op. 54; Life, dream and death Op. 55; Ode to Music, Op. 92; Vision, Op. 99; Symphonic Epilogue, Op. 108. Deutsches Symphonie-Orchester Berlin/Roger Epple, Capriccio 67 077 (2004)
 Violin Concerto: with Prosperos Beschwörungen, Op. 53. Andrea Duka Lowenstein (violin), Radio Symphonie Orchester Wien/Gerd Albrecht, ORFEO C 478 981 (1999)

Works
Stage
 Das Wunder der Diana, op. 18 (1914–1917), ballet after Béla Balázs
 Die Prinzessin Girnara, op. 27 (1919–1920), libretto by Jakob Wassermann
 Persisches Ballett, op. 30 (1920), ballet after Ellen Tels
 Achilles auf Skyros, op. 33 (1921), ballet after Hugo von Hofmannsthal
 Alkestis, op. 35 (1924), Libretto by Hugo von Hofmannsthal after Euripides
 Die Nächtlichen: Tanzsinfonien, op. 37 (1924), Ballet scene after Max Terpis
 Die Opferung des Gefangenen, op. 40 (1924–1925), Stage drama after Eduard Stucken
 Scherz, List und Rache, op. 41 (1927), libretto after Johann Wolfgang von Goethe
 Die Bakchantinnen, op. 44 (1931), libretto by the composer after Euripides, opera in 2 Acts
 *Hymne der Agave aus Die Bakchantinnen, op. 44, concert edition by Wellesz
 Incognita, op. 69 (1950), libretto Elizabeth MacKenzie, based on the novel by William Congreve

Choral
 Drei gemischte Chöre, op. 43 (1930), text: Angelus Silesius
 Fünf kleine Männerchöre, op. 46 (1932) from Fränkischen Koran by Ludwig Derleth
 Drei geistliche Chöre, op. 47 (1932) for men's chorus based on poems from Mitte des Lebens by Rudolf Alexander Schröder
 Zwei Gesänge, op. 48 (1932) based on poems from Mitte des Lebens by Rudolf Alexander Schröder
 Mass in F minor, op. 51 (1934). Recorded by the choir of Christ Church, Oxford, 2010
 Quant'è bella Giovinezza, op. 59 (1937), for women's choir
 Carol, op. 62a (1944) for women's choir
 Proprium Missae, Laetare, op. 71 (1953) for choir and organ
 Kleine Messe in G major, op. 80a (1958) for three similar voices a capella
 Alleluia, op. 80b (1958) for soprano or tenor solo
 Laus Nocturna, op. 88 (1962)
 Missa brevis, op. 89 (1963). Recorded by the choir of Christ Church, Oxford, 2010
 To Sleep, op. 94 (1965). Recorded by the choir of Christ Church, Oxford, 2010
 Offertorium in Ascensione Domini (1965). Recorded by the choir of Christ Church, Oxford, 2010
 Festliches Präludium, op. 100 (1966) on a Byzantinium Magnificat for choir and organ

Orchestral
 Heldensang, op. 2 (1905), symphonic prologue for large orchestra
 Vorfrühling ('The Dawn of Spring'), op. 12 (1912), symphonic poem. Recorded by Deutsches Symphonie-Orchester Berlin, 2004
 Suite, op. 16 (1913), for orchestra
 Mitte des Lebens, op. 45 (1931–32), cantata for soprano, choir, and orchestra
 Piano Concerto, op. 49 (1933). Recorded by Berlin Radio Symphony Orchestra, soloist Margarete Babinsky, 2010
 Amor Timido, op. 50 (1933), aria for soprano and small orchestra, text: Pietro Metastasio
 Prosperos Beschwörungen, op. 53 (1934–36), five symphonic movements for orchestra after The Tempest. Recorded by Radio Symphonie Orchester Wien/Gerd Albrecht.
 Lied der Welt, op. 54 (1936–38), for soprano and orchestra. Text: Hugo von Hofmannsthal. Recorded by Deutsches Symphonie-Orchester Berlin, 2004
 Leben, Traum und Tod, op. 55 (1936–37), for alto and orchestra. Text: Hugo von Hofmannsthal. Recorded by Deutsches Symphonie-Orchester Berlin, 2004
 Schönbüheler Messe in C major, op. 58 (1937), for choir, orchestra, and organ
 Symphony No. 1, op. 62 (1945)
 Symphony No. 2, op. 65 (1947–48), The English Symphony No. 3, op. 68 (1949–51)
 Symphony No. 4, op. 70 (1951–53), Austriaca Symphony No. 5, op. 75 (1955–56)
 Violin concerto, op. 84 (1961), dedicated to the violinist Eduard Melkus. Recorded by Andrea Duka Lowenstein in 1999 and David Frühwirth in 2010.
 Four Songs of Return, op. 85 (1961), for soprano and chamber orchestra, after texts by Elizabeth Mackenzie
 Duineser Elegie, op. 90 (1963) for soprano, choir, and orchestra after Rainer Maria Rilke
 Ode an die Musik, op. 92 (1965) for baritone or alto and chamber orchestra, text: Pindar, adapted from Friedrich Hölderlin. Recorded by Deutsches Symphonie-Orchester Berlin, 2004
 Symphony No. 6, op. 95 (1965)
 Vision for soprano and orchester, op. 99 (1966), text: Georg Trakl. Recorded by Deutsches Symphonie-Orchester Berlin, 2004
 Mirabile Mysterium, op. 101 (1967) for soloist, choir, and Orchester
 Symphony No. 7, op. 102 (1967–68), Contra torrentem Canticum Sapientiae, op. 104 (1968) for baritone, choir, and orchestra after texts from the Old Testament
 Divertimento, op. 107 (1969), for small orchestra. Recorded by Luzerner Sinfonieorchester/Howard Griffiths, 1999
 Symphonic Epilogue, op. 108 (1969). Recorded by Deutsches Symphonie-Orchester Berlin, 2004
 Symphony No. 8, op. 110 (1970)
 Symphony No. 9, op. 111 (1970–71)

Chamber and instrumental
 Der Abend, op. 4 (1909–10), four pieces for piano
 Drei Skizzen, op. 6 (1911), for piano. Recorded by Karl-Andreas Kolly, 1999
 Eklogen, op. 11, four pieces for piano. Recorded by Karl-Andreas Kolly, 1999
 String Quartet No. 1, op. 14 (1912)
 String Quartet No. 2, op. 20 (1915–16)
 Idyllen, op. 21 (1917), five pieces for piano after poems by Stefan George
 Geistliches Lied, op. 23 (1918–19) for singing voice, violin, viola, and piano
 String Quartet No. 3, op. 25 (1918). Recorded by Artis Quartett Wien, 2008
 String Quartet No. 4, op. 28 (1920). Recorded by Artis Quartett Wien, 2008
 Sonata for violoncello solo, op. 31 (1920)
 Zwei Stücke for clarinet and piano, op. 34 (1922)
 Sonata for violin solo, op. 36 (1923)
 Suite for violin and chamber orchestra, op. 38 (1924)
 Sonnets from the Portuguese for soprano and string quartet or string ensemble, op. 52 (1934). Recorded by Deutsches Symphonie-Orchester Berlin, 2004
 Suite for violoncello solo, op. 39 (1924)
 Suite for violin and piano, op. 56 (1937/1957)
 Suite for flute solo, op. 57 (1937)
 String quartet No. 5, op. 60 (1943)
 The Leaden Echo and the Golden Echo, cantata for soprano, clarinet, violoncello, piano, op. 61 (1944), text: Gerard Manley Hopkins
 String Quartet No. 6, op. 64 (1946). Recorded by Artis Quartett Wien, 2008
 String Quartet No. 7, op. 66 (1948)
 Octet, op. 67 (1948–49) for clarinet, bassoon, horn, two violins, viola, violoncello, and contrabass
 Sonata for violin solo, op. 72 (1953/59)
 Suite, op. 73 (1954) for flute, oboe, clarinet, horn, and bassoon
 Suite for solo clarinet, op. 74 (1956)
 Suite for solo oboe, op. 76 (1956)
 Suite for solo bassoon, op. 77 (1957)
 Fanfare for solo horn, op. 78 (1957)
 String Quartet No. 8, op. 79 (1957). Recorded by Artis Quartett Wien, 2008
 Quintet, op. 81 (1959) for clarinet, 2 violins, viola, and violoncello
 String trio, op. 86 (1962)
 Rhapsody for viola solo, op. 87 (1962)
 Musik for string orchestra in one movement, op. 91 (1964)
 Fünf Miniaturen for violins and piano, op. 93 (1965)
 Partita in Honor of Johann Sebastian Bach, op. 96 (1965) for organ
 String Quartet No. 9, op. 97 (1966)
 Triptychon, op. 98, three pieces for piano (1966). Recorded by Karl-Andreas Kolly, 1999
 Four Pieces for string quartet, op. 103 (1968)
 Four Pieces for string trio, op. 105 (1969, second version 1971)
 Five Studies in Grey, op. 106, for piano (1969)
 Four Pieces for string quintet, op. 109 (1970)
 Prelude for viola solo, op. 112 (1971)

Decorations and awards
 1953: City of Vienna Prize for Music
 1957: Commander of the Order of the British Empire
 1957: Great Silver Medal of the City of Paris
 1959: Grand Decoration of Honour in Gold for Services to the Republic of Austria
 1961: Grand Austrian State Prize for Music
 1961: Order of St. Gregory the Great (Vatican)
 1971: Foreign Member of the Serbian Academy of Sciences and Arts
 1971: Austrian Decoration for Science and Art
 1973: Honorary Member of the Society of Friends of Music in Vienna

Bibliography
  
 
 
 
 

 See also 
 List of émigré composers in Britain

References

Further reading
 Hans F. Redlich, "Egon Wellesz", in: The Musical Quarterly, XXVI (1940), 65–75.
 Rudolph Reti, "Egon Wellesz, Musician and scholar", in: The Musical Quarterly, XLII (1956), 1–13.
 Robert Scholium, Egon Wellesz, in: Österreichische Komponisten des XX. Jahrhunderts, vol. 2, Vienna: Elisabeth Lafite 1964.
 Caroline Cepin Benser, Egon Wellesz (1885–1974): Chronicle of a Twentieth-Century Musician, New York: P. Lang, 1985 .
 Otto Kolleritsch (ed.), Egon Wellesz, Studien zur Wertungsforschung, vol. 17, Graz and Vienna: Universal Edition 1986.
 Lorenz Wedl, "Die Bacchantinnen" von Egon Wellesz oder das göttliche Wunder, Wien/Köln/Weimar, Böhlau 1992.
 Harald Kaufmann, Gespräch mit Egon Wellesz, in: Harald Kaufmann, Von innen und außen. Schriften über Musik, Musikleben und Ästhetik, ed. by Werner Grünzweig and Gottfried Krieger. Wolke: Hofheim, 1993, .
 Knut Eckhardt, Das Verhältnis von Klangfarbe und Form bei Egon Wellesz, Göttingen: Edition Re, 1994.
 David Symons, Egon Wellesz. Composer, Wilhelmshaven, Florian Noetzel 1996.
 Snowman, Daniel, The Hitler Emigrés, Penguin, 2002
 Marcus G. Patka/Michael Haas (eds.): Hans Gál und Egon Wellesz: Continental Britons. Ausstellung "Continental Britons – Hans Gál und Egon Wellesz des Jüdischen Museums der Stadt Wien vom 25. Februar – 2. Mai 2004 (= ''Musik des Aufbruchs''). Im Auftrag des Jüdischen Museums Wien. Vienna: Mandelbaum-Verlag, 2004, .
 Jürgen Maehder, Das Quiché-Drama »Rabinal Achí«, Brasseur de Bourbourg und das Tanzdrama »Die Opferung des Gefangenen« von Egon Wellesz, in: Peter Csobádi, Ulrich Müller, et al. (eds.), Das (Musik)-Theater in Exil und Diktatur und seine Rezeption. Vorträge und Gespräche des Salzburger Symposiums 2003, Anif/Salzburg: Müller-Speiser 2005, .
 Pietro Massa, Antikerezeption und musikalische Dramaturgie in »Die Bakchantinnen« von Egon Wellesz, in: Peter Csobádi, Ulrich Müller et al. (eds.), Das (Musik)-Theater in Exil und Diktatur und seine Rezeption. Vorträge und Gespräche des Salzburger Symposiums 2003, Anif/Salzburg: Müller-Speiser 2005, .
 Michael Hass, [https://yalebooks.yale.edu/book/9780300205350/forbidden-music Forbidden Music: The Jewish Composers Banned by the Nazis, Yale University Press, 2013
 Jörg Bierhance, The Observation of Form: The form analysis method of Constantin Bugeanu in reference to the 1st and 5th Symphonies of Egon Wellesz, Academia, 2018
 Bojan Bujić: Arnold Schoenberg and Egon Wellesz: A Fraught Relationship'', Boydell and Brewer, 2020

External links
 
 Klavierkonzert/Violinkonzert, Babinsky (piano), David Frühwirth (violin), Epple (conductor), Egon Wellesz (composer)
 Egon-Wellesz-Fonds at the Gesellschaft der Musikfreunde, Vienna (also includes a News section with recent performances of Wellesz' compositions)

1885 births
1974 deaths
20th-century Austrian composers
20th-century Austrian male musicians
20th-century British composers
20th-century British musicologists
20th-century British male musicians
20th-century classical composers
Academic staff of the University of Vienna
Austrian classical composers
Austrian musicologists
Austrian opera composers
Hungarian composers
Hungarian male composers
British classical composers
British male classical composers
Jewish classical composers
Jewish musicologists
Second Viennese School
Fellows of Lincoln College, Oxford
Male opera composers
Jewish emigrants from Austria to the United Kingdom after the Anschluss
Burials at the Vienna Central Cemetery
Commanders of the Order of the British Empire
Recipients of the Grand Decoration for Services to the Republic of Austria
Recipients of the Grand Austrian State Prize
Knights of St. Gregory the Great
Recipients of the Austrian Decoration for Science and Art
Members of the Society of Friends of Music in Vienna
People interned in the Isle of Man during World War II
Members of the Serbian Academy of Sciences and Arts
Pupils of Arnold Schoenberg
University of Vienna alumni